George "Shino" Shenton (15 June 1899 – 10 February 1978) was an English footballer who played at right-back for Port Vale from 1927 to 1936. Featuring in 196 league and cup games, he helped the "Valiants" to win the Third Division North title in 1929–30.

Career
Shenton played for Naybro Stone, Downing's Tileries and Blythe Bridge, before joining Port Vale as an amateur in June 1927. He signed professional forms with the "Valiants" in August that year, and made his debut on 10 November in a 3–1 defeat to Grimsby Town at Blundell Park. He played a total of ten Second Division games in the 1928–29 season, as Vale suffered relegation. He played 35 games of the 1929–30 Third Division North title winning campaign, playing opposite of Jimmy Oakes. He went on to feature 42 times in the 1930–31 season, as the side posted a club record finish of fifth in the Second Division. He played 41 games in the 1931–32 season, and recovered from a twisted knee to post 29 appearances in the 1932–33 campaign. Shenton then lost his first team place, and featured just ten times in the 1933–34 season, 15 times in the 1934–35 season, and 14 times in the 1935–36 campaign. He was released from The Old Recreation Ground in the summer, and later played for Shelton Iron and Steel. His benefit match was held against rivals Stoke on 30 September 1935; Vale lost the game 6–2.

Career statistics

Honours
Port Vale
Football League Third Division North: 1929–30

References

Sportspeople from Hanley, Staffordshire
English footballers
Association football fullbacks
Port Vale F.C. players
English Football League players
1899 births
1978 deaths